Gračac is a town and municipality in the southern part of Lika, Croatia. The municipality is administratively part of Zadar County.

Gračac is located south of Udbina, northeast of Obrovac, northwest of Knin and southeast of Gospić.

Settlements
The total municipality population is 4,690 (census 2011), in the following settlements:

 Begluci, population 61
 Brotnja, population 47
 Bruvno, population 92
 Cerovac, population 3
 Dabašnica, population 3
 Deringaj, population 77
 Donja Suvaja, population 53
 Drenovac Osredački, population 12
 Duboki Dol, population 0
 Dugopolje, population 20
 Glogovo, population 11
 Gornja Suvaja, population 36
 Grab, population 78
 Gračac, population 3,063
 Gubavčevo Polje, population 3
 Kaldrma, population 31
 Kijani, population 56
 Kom, population 34
 Kunovac Kupirovački, population 37
 Kupirovo, population 46
 Mazin, population 47
 Nadvrelo, population 1
 Neteka, population 87
 Omsica, population 12
 Osredci, population 42
 Otrić, population 15
 Palanka, population 19
 Pribudić, population 5
 Prljevo, population 7
 Rastičevo, population 4
 Rudopolje Bruvanjsko, population 31
 Srb, population 472
 Tiškovac Lički, population 15
 Tomingaj, population 26
 Velika Popina, population 71
 Vučipolje, population 1
 Zaklopac, population 23
 Zrmanja, population 21
 Zrmanja Vrelo, population 28

History
Gračac was ruled by Ottoman Empire between 1527 and 1687 (nominally to 1699) as part of the Sanjak of Lika in the Bosnia Eyalet before Austrian conquest. The 1712–14 census of Lika and Krbava registered 1,711 inhabitants, out of whom 1,655 were Vlachs, 53 were Catholic Bunjevci and 3 were Catholic Croats. The term "Vlach" was used at the time to describe a population of Eastern Orthodox religion and rarely as an ethnic group. Those families that moved to Gračac came from area south east of Belgrade. In the late 19th century and early 20th century, Gračac was part of the Lika-Krbava County of the Kingdom of Serbs, Croats and Slovenes.

From 1992 to 1992, Gračac was part of the self-proclaimed Republic of Serbian Krajina. In 1995, the town was taken over by Croatian forces during Operation Storm. At least 14 Serb civilians were killed by the Croatian Army in the nearby Kijani village during and in the aftermath of Operation Storm in August 1995.

The area of Gračac was not part of the Austro-Hungarian crown land of Dalmatia, but it is often perceived as part of Dalmatia in the modern sense because of its inclusion in Zadar County.

Demographics

Note: in some censa, such as in 1981, parts of the population listed themselves as Yugoslavs instead of Croat or Serb.

Attractions
The name Gračac is derived from "gradina" which means an old abandoned castle. Near the town there are Lake Štikada and the karst field of Gračac. The Cerovac caves nearby are open for tourists. The town is on the way into the Lika region of Zadar county, and the surroundings offer good hunting game.

Notable people 
 Ilija Ivezić
 Danilo Stanisavljević
 Petar Škundrić

References

External links

 
 Gracac-Zadar County Tourist Office

Municipalities of Croatia
Populated places in Zadar County
Lika